Uchenna Emedolu (born 17 September 1976, in Adazi-Ani) is a retired Nigerian athlete who specialised in short-distance sprints, particularly the 100 metres and the 200 metres. In 100 metres his personal best time is 9.97 seconds, achieved at the 2003 All-Africa Games where he finished second. This ranks him ninth in Nigeria, behind Olusoji Fasuba, Divine Oduduru, Seun Ogunkoya, Davidson Ezinwa, Olapade Adeniken, Deji Aliu, Raymond Ekevwo and Francis Obikwelu.

Emedolu participated in the 2000, 2004 and 2008 Summer Olympics. In 2004 he achieved a semi-final place in the individual 100 metres. Together with Olusoji Fasuba, Aaron Egbele and Deji Aliu he won the bronze medal in the 4x100 metres relay. The 2008 Summer Olympics in Beijing were less successful. In the individual event he did only finish in fourth place in the first rounds heat 10.46 seconds and was eliminated. In the 4x100 metres relay he, together with Onyeabor Ngwogu, Obinna Metu and Chinedu Oriala did not finish the race in the heats due to a mistake.

Statistics

Personal bests

All information taken from IAAF Profile.

References

External links
 
IAAF "Focus on Athletes" article



1976 births
Living people
Nigerian male sprinters
Athletes (track and field) at the 2000 Summer Olympics
Athletes (track and field) at the 2004 Summer Olympics
Athletes (track and field) at the 2008 Summer Olympics
Olympic athletes of Nigeria
Olympic bronze medalists for Nigeria
Athletes (track and field) at the 2006 Commonwealth Games
Commonwealth Games medallists in athletics
Medalists at the 2004 Summer Olympics
Olympic bronze medalists in athletics (track and field)
Commonwealth Games silver medallists for Nigeria
African Games gold medalists for Nigeria
African Games medalists in athletics (track and field)
Athletes (track and field) at the 2003 All-Africa Games
20th-century Nigerian people
21st-century Nigerian people
Medallists at the 2002 Commonwealth Games
African Games bronze medalists for Nigeria